Niko Ikävalko (born 24 April 1988) is a Finnish footballer who plays as a forward for MyPa.

References

External links
 

1988 births
Living people
Footballers from Helsinki
Finnish footballers
Veikkausliiga players
FC Haka players
Kotkan Työväen Palloilijat players
Sudet players
Association football forwards